Laura Horváth is a Hungarian professional CrossFit athlete. She has won two silver medals and a bronze at the CrossFit Games.

Horvath has a background in the sport of climbing, but later switched to CrossFit.  She qualified for her first CrossFit Games in 2018, coming second at the Games and was named Rookie of the Year. She won a further silver in 21019 and then a bronze in 2022. She also competes in weightlifting, and has won a competition with a national record for clean and jerk.

Early life

Horvath was born to Ernő Horváth and Emese Szöllősi from Budapest, Hungary, both physical education teachers. She is the middle of three children, and has an elder brother Kristof, and a younger brother Botond. She played many sports when young but eventually settled on the sport of wall climbing. She was introduced to CrossFit by her brother Kristof in 2014, and initially used it to complement her training, but eventually became more involved in the sport.

Career
Horvath was initially involved in the sport of climbing, and was a junior national champion. She also competed in the European youth competitions. She was introduced to CrossFit in 2014 by her brother Kristof, and competed in her first CrossFit competition in 2015 at the Central European Throwdown where she managed to finish fourth.  She competed in her first Open in 2015 a month later but finished only 25th in Hungary. The following year, she made the regional after placing 23rd in Europe at the Open. In 2017, she achieved her breakthrough in the sport after coming second in the Dubai Fitness Championship behind Annie Thorisdottir.

In 2018, Horvath became the first Hungarian women to reach the CrossFit Games. She started well on the first day of the Games, and finished top of the leaderboard at the end of the first day. Defending champion Tia-Clair Toomey however came back strongly to win by 64 points, while Horvath came in comfortably at second place beating off Katrin Davidsdottir for the position. She was named Rookie of the Year.

At the Dubai Crossfit Championship held in December 2018, Horvath had to withdraw due to a back injury despite being the favorite to win. She nevertheless qualified for the 2019 Games as national champion, however, she was eliminated on the 3rd day after failing to make the cut for the top 10, and ending up in 14th place.

In the 2020 season disrupted by the Covid-19 pandemic, Horvath failed to reach the final stage of the revamped Games after finishing only 24th in the online stage of the Games.

After two disappointing seasons, Horvath moved to train with former champion Ben Smith. At the 2021 CrossFit Games, Horvath returned to the podium, again coming second behind Tia-Clair Toomey.

At the 2022 CrossFit Games, Horvath started poorly, but managed to climb back up the leaderboard with wins and good placements in the final two days, eventually finishing third behind Tia-Clair Toomey and Mal O'Brien.  
Two months later she won the 2022 Rogue Invitational. In January 2023, she took part in the team competition at Wodapalooza with Jamie Simmonds and Gabriela Migala and won.

In March 2023, Horvath competed in the Savaria Cup weightlifting competition and won the 76 kg category with a lift of 117 kg in clean and jerk, improving the national record by 1 kg (total 206 kg).

CrossFit Games results

References

External links
 Laura Horvath at CrossFit Games

1997 births
Living people
Hungarian sportswomen
Sportspeople from Budapest
CrossFit athletes